Ames is a city in Story County, Iowa, United States, located approximately  north of Des Moines in central Iowa. It is best known as the home of Iowa State University (ISU), with leading agriculture, design, engineering, and veterinary medicine colleges. A United States Department of Energy national laboratory, Ames Laboratory, is located on the ISU campus.

According to the 2020 census, Ames had a population of 66,427, making it the state's ninth largest city. Iowa State University was home to 27,854 students as of spring 2023, which make up approximately one half of the city's population.

Ames also hosts United States Department of Agriculture (USDA) sites: the largest federal animal disease center in the United States, the USDA Agricultural Research Service's National Animal Disease Center (NADC), as well as one of two national USDA sites for the Animal and Plant Health Inspection Service (APHIS), which comprises the National Veterinary Services Laboratory and the Center for Veterinary Biologics. Ames also hosts the headquarters for the Iowa Department of Transportation.

History 
The city was formed in 1864 as a station stop on the Cedar Rapids and Missouri Railroad and was named after 19th century U.S. Congressman Oakes Ames of Massachusetts, who was influential in the building of the transcontinental railroad. Ames was founded by local resident Cynthia Olive Duff (née Kellogg) and railroad magnate John Insley Blair, near a location that was deemed favorable for a railroad crossing of the Skunk River.

Geography
A smaller highway, U.S. Route 69, passes through the town. Also passing through Ames is the cross country line of the Union Pacific Railroad and two small streams (the South Skunk River and Ioway Creek).

Campustown
Campustown is the neighborhood directly south of Iowa State University Central Campus bordered by Lincoln Way on the north. Campustown is a high-density mixed-use neighborhood that is home to many student apartments, nightlife venues, restaurants, and numerous other establishments, most of which are unique to Ames.

Climate
Ames has a humid continental climate (Köppen climate classification Dfa). On average, the warmest month is July and the coldest is January.

Demographics

2010 census 
As of the census of 2010, there were 58,965 people, 22,759 households, and 9,959 families residing in the city. The racial makeup of the city was 84.5% White, 3.4% African American, 0.2% Native American, 8.8% Asian, 1.1% from other races, and 2.0% from two or more races. Hispanic or Latino of any race were 3.4% of the population.

There were 22,759 households, of which 19.1% had children under the age of 18 living with them, 35.6% were married couples living together, 5.4% had a female householder with no husband present, 2.7% had a male householder with no wife present, and 56.2% were non-families. 30.5% of all households were made up of individuals, and 6.2% had someone living alone who was 65 years of age or older. The average household size was 2.25 and the average family size was 2.82.

The median age in the city was 23.8 years. 13.4% of residents were under the age of 18; 40.5% were between the ages of 18 and 24; 22.9% were from 25 to 44; 15% were from 45 to 64; and 8.1% were 65 years of age or older. The gender makeup of the city was 53.0% male and 47.0% female.

2000 census 
As of the census of 2000, there were 50,731 people, 18,085 households, and 8,970 families residing in the city. The racial makeup of the city was 87.34% White, 7.70% Asian, 2.65% African American, 0.04% Native American, 0.76% Pacific Islander and other races, and 1.36% from two or more races. Hispanic or Latino of any race were 1.98% of the population.

There were 18,085 households, out of which 22.3% had children under the age of 18 living with them, 42.0% were married couples living together, 5.3% had a female householder with no husband present, and 50.4% were non-families. 28.5% of all households were made up of individuals, and 5.9% had someone living alone who was 65 years of age or older. The average household size was 2.30 and the average family size was 2.85.

Age spread: 14.6% under the age of 18, 40.0% from 18 to 24, 23.7% from 25 to 44, 13.9% from 45 to 64, and 7.7% who were 65 years of age or older. The median age was 24 years. For every 100 females, there were 109.3 males. For every 100 females age 18 and over, there were 109.9 males.

The median income for a household in the city was $36,042, and the median income for a family was $56,439. Males had a median income of $37,877 versus $28,198 for females. The per capita income for the city was $18,881. About 7.6% of families and 20.4% of the population were below the poverty line, including 9.2% of those under age 18 and 4.1% of those age 65 or over.

Metropolitan area 

The U.S. Census Bureau designates the Ames MSA as encompassing all of Story County.

Ames metropolitan statistical area combined with the Boone, Iowa micropolitan statistical area (Boone County, Iowa) make up the larger Ames-Boone combined statistical area. Ames is the larger principal city of the Combined Statistical Area that includes all of Story County, Iowa and Boone County, Iowa. which had a combined population of 106,205 at the 2000 census.

Economy 
Ames is home of Iowa State University of Science and Technology, a public land-grant and space-grant research university. At its founding in 1858, Iowa State was formerly known as the Iowa State College of Agriculture and Mechanic Arts. Ames is the home of the closely allied U.S. Department of Agriculture's National Animal Disease Center (See Ames strain), the U.S. Department of Energy's Ames Laboratory (a major materials research and development facility), and the main offices of the Iowa Department of Transportation. State and Federal institutions are the largest employers in Ames.

Other area employers include a 3M manufacturing plant; Danfoss Power Solutions, a hydraulics manufacturer; Barilla, a pasta manufacturer; Ball, a manufacturer of canning jars and plastic bottles; Workiva, a global cloud computing company; Renewable Energy Group, America's largest producer of biomass-based diesel; and the National Farmers Organization.

The Iowa State University Research Park is a not-for-profit, business development incubator located in Ames, and affiliated with Iowa State University.

In 2015, Ames was ranked in the top 15 "Cities That Have Done the Best Since the Recession" by Bloomberg Businessweek.

The Bureau of Labor Statistics ranked Ames and Boulder, CO as having the lowest unemployment rate (2.5%) of any metropolitan area in the US in 2016. By June 2018, unemployment in Ames had fallen even further, to 1.5%, and wage increases for workers were not keeping pace with rising rents.

Top employers 
According to Ames's 2020 Comprehensive Annual Financial Report, the top employers in the city are:

Arts and culture 
Ames History Museum - founded in 1980, the museum also operates a historic schoolhouse.
Brunnier Art Museum (Scheman Building)
Ames Public Library - located in a Carnegie library, it was founded in 1904. it has 1,386,273 items in circulations, including 799,349 books and 586,924 multimedia items.
The Octagon Center for the Arts - the Center includes galleries, art classes, art studios, and retail shop. They sponsor the local street fair, The Octagon Arts Festival, and hold an annual National Juried Exhibition Clay, Fiber, Paper Glass Metal, Wood.

Sports 
Iowa Sports Foundation

The Iowa State Cyclones play a variety of sports in the Ames area. The Iowa State Cyclones football team plays at Jack Trice Stadium in Ames. Also, the Cyclones' Men's and Women's Basketball teams and Volleyball teams play at Hilton Coliseum just across the street from Jack Trice Stadium. The Iowa State Cyclones are a charter member of the Big 12 Conference in all sports and compete in NCAA Division I-A. The Iowa State Women's Tennis is also well known and very successful.

The Ames Figure Skating Club provides recreational to professional level skating opportunities.  The club sponsors the Learn to Skate Program.  Coaches provide on and off ice lessons or workshops. The club hosts the figure skating portion of the Iowa Games competition every summer.  In the fall the club hosts Cyclone Country Championships.

The Ames ISU ice arena also hosts the Iowa State Cyclones hockey team. The arena also hosts the Ames Little Cyclones hockey program for high school students and children in elementary or middle school.

Education 
Much of the city is served by the Ames Community School District.

A portion of northern Ames is zoned to the Gilbert Community School District.

Public high school in Ames
Ames High School: Grades 9–12

Public elementary/middle schools in Ames
David Edwards Elementary: K-5
Abbie Sawyer Elementary School: Grades K-5
Kate Mitchell Elementary School: Grades K-5
Warren H. Meeker Elementary School: Grades K-5
Gertrude Fellows Elementary School: Grades K-5
Ames Middle School: Grades 6–8

Gilbert CSD students are zoned to Gilbert High School.

Private schools in Ames
Ames Christian School
Saint Cecilia School (preK – 5th grade)

Iowa State University 

Iowa State University of Science and Technology, more commonly known as Iowa State University (ISU), is a public land-grant and space-grant research university located in Ames. Iowa State University is the birthplace of the Atanasoff–Berry Computer, the world's first electronic digital computer. Iowa State has produced a number of astronauts, scientists, Nobel laureates, and Pulitzer Prize winners. Until 1945 it was known as the Iowa State College of Agriculture and Mechanic Arts. The university is a member of the American Association of Universities and the Big 12 Conference.

ISU is the nation's first designated land-grant university In 1856, the Iowa General Assembly enacted legislation to establish the State Agricultural College and Model Farm. Story County was chosen as the location on June 21, 1859, from proposals by Johnson, Kossuth, Marshall, Polk, and Story counties. When Iowa accepted the provisions of the Morrill Act of 1862, Iowa State became the first institution in nation designated as a land-grant college. The institution was coeducational from the first preparatory class admitted in 1868. The formal admitting of students began the following year, and the first graduating class of 1872 consisted of 24 men and 2 women.

The first building on the Iowa State campus was Farm House. Built in the 1860s, it currently serves as a museum and National Historic Landmark. Today, Iowa State has over 60 notable buildings, including Beardshear Hall, Morrill Hall, Memorial Union, Catt Hall, Curtiss Hall, Carver Hall, Parks Library, the Campanile, Hilton Coliseum, C.Y. Stephens Auditorium, Fisher Theater, Jack Trice Stadium, Lied Recreation Center, numerous residence halls, and many buildings specific to ISU's many different majors and colleges.

The official mascot for ISU is Cy the Cardinal. The official school colors are cardinal and gold. The Iowa State Cyclones play in the NCAA's Division I-A as a member of the Big 12 Conference.

Media 
Online and newsprint
Ames Tribune, Tuesday-Sunday paper produced in Ames.
Iowa State Daily, independent student newspaper produced at Iowa State University.
The Des Moines Register also provides extensive coverage of Iowa news and sports to Ames.
Story County Sun, weekly newspaper that covers the entire county published in Ames.
Radio stations licensed to Ames
KURE, student radio operated at Iowa State University.
WOI-FM, Iowa Public Radio's flagship "Studio One" station, broadcasting an NPR news format during the day and a music format in the evening, owned and operated at Iowa State University.
WOI (AM), Iowa Public Radio's flagship station delivering a 24-hour news format consisting mainly of NPR programming, owned and operated at Iowa State University.
KOEZ, Adult Contemporary station licensed to Ames, but operated in Des Moines.
KCYZ, Hot Adult Contemporary station owned and operated by Clear Channel in Ames.
KASI, news/talk station owned and operated by Clear Channel in Ames.
KNWM-FM, Contemporary Christian Madrid/Ames station owned and operated by the University of Northwestern – St. Paul - simulcast with KNWI-FM Osceola/Des Moines
KHOI, Community Radio station licensed to Story City with studios in Ames. KHOI broadcasts music and local public affairs programs and is affiliated with the Pacifica Radio network.
Ames is also served by stations in the Des Moines media market, which includes Clear Channel's 50,000-watt talk station WHO, music stations KAZR, KDRB, KGGO, KKDM, KHKI, KIOA, KJJY, KRNT, KSPZ and KSTZ, talk station KWQW, and sports stations KXNO and KXNO-FM.
Television
Like radio, Ames is served by the Des Moines media market. WOI-DT, the ABC affiliate in central Iowa, was originally owned and operated by Iowa State University until the 1990s. The station is still licensed to Ames, but studio's are located in West Des Moines. Other stations serving Ames include KCCI, KDIN-TV, WHO-DT, KCWI-TV, KDMI, KDSM-TV and KFPX-TV.

Channel 12 is owned by the City of Ames and overseen by the City Manager's Office. The channel broadcasts meetings for city council as well as other city government councils and boards. Channel 12 also produces its own original content focused on news and other happenings in Ames. Channel 12 has won various regional and national awards including a NATOA Government Programming Award and a Telly Award. Channel 12's goals are "To provide quality programming to the citizens of Ames that educates and informs about city government issues" and "To provide live coverage and rebroadcasts of council and commission meetings."

Channel 16 serves as Ames' public access TV channel. "The purpose of Ames Public Access TV (Channel 16) is to provide residents the opportunity to broadcast locally produced programs on cable television.  APATV provides cablecasting of non-commercial, public access programming independently produced by professionals or non-professionals in either a VHS or DVD format.  This service is provided on a first-come-first-served, non-discriminatory, non monopolistic basis.  Other services include video messaging to serve as a community calendar."

Infrastructure

Transportation 

The town is served by U.S. Highways 30 and 69 and Interstate 35. Ames is the only town in Iowa with a population of greater than 50,000 that does not have a state highway serving it. , Ames currently has three roundabouts constructed on University Avenue/530th Avenue. The first is at the intersection of Airport Road (Oakwood Rd.) and University Avenue, the second at the intersection of Cottonwood Road and 530th Avenue and the third at Collaboration Place and 530th Avenue.

Ames was serviced by the Fort Dodge, Des Moines and Southern Railroad via a branch from Kelley to Iowa State and to downtown Ames. The tracks were removed in the 1960s. The Chicago and North Western Transportation Company twin mainline runs east and west bisecting the town and running just south of the downtown business district. The C&NW used to operate a branch to Des Moines. This line was removed in the 1980s when the Spine Line through the nearby city of Nevada was purchased from the Rock Island Railroad after its bankruptcy. The Union Pacific, successor to the C&NW, still runs 60–70 trains a day through Ames on twin mainlines, which leads to some traffic delays. There is also a branch to Eagle Grove that leaves Ames to the north. The Union Pacific maintains a small yard called Ames Yard east of Ames between Ames and Nevada. Ames has been testing automatic train horns at several of its crossings. These directional horns which are focused down the streets are activated when the crossing signals turn on and are shut off after the train crosses the crossing. This system cancels out the need for the trains to blow their horns. Train noise had been a problem in the residential areas to the west and northwest of downtown.

The current (and only) fixed-base operator is Central Iowa Air Service.

The City of Ames offers a transit system throughout town, called CyRide, that is funded jointly by Iowa State University, the ISU Government of the Student Body, and the City of Ames. Rider fares are free for children under five, while students pay a set cost as part of their tuition. In addition to local transit, Ames is served by intercity buses from Jefferson Lines, which stop at the Ames Intermodal Facility.

In 2009, the Ames metropolitan statistical area (MSA) ranked as the third highest in the United States for percentage of commuters who walked to work (10.4 percent).

Ames has the headquarters of the Iowa Department of Transportation.

Health care 
Ames is served by Mary Greeley Medical Center, a 220-bed regional referral hospital which is adjacent to McFarland Clinic PC, central Iowa's largest physician-owned multi-specialty clinic, and also Iowa Heart Center.

Parks and recreation 
On September 10, 2019 the City of Ames proposed a $29,000,000 bond for building a fitness center called the Healthy Life Center. It failed to pass. Iowa State University owns the land it was to be built on.

In popular culture 
The character of Kate Austen in the television series Lost (2004–2010) is from Ames.
Ames is prominently featured in Jeffrey Zaslow's 2009 book The Girls from Ames.
Ames is featured in the 2012 Supernatural episode "Heartache".
Ames is mentioned in the music video for Bo Burnham's 2013 song "Repeat Stuff", which shows satirical subliminal messages quickly flashing up on the screen, one of which states that "Michael Clarke Duncan is alive and living in Ames, Iowa".

Notable people  

This is a list of notable people associated with Ames, Iowa arranged by career and in alphabetical order.

Acting 
 Evan Helmuth, actor (1977-2017) (Fever Pitch, The Devil Inside)
 Nick Nolte, actor, lived in Ames, 1945-1950

Artists and photographers 
 John E. Buck, sculptor
 Robert Crumb, cartoonist and musician, the Crumb family moved to Ames in August 1950, for two years.
 Margaret Lloyd, opera singer
 Laurel Nakadate, American video artist, filmmaker and photographer
 Velma Wallace Rayness (1896–1977), "V.W. Rayness," author, painter and artist
 Brian Smith, Pulitzer Prize-winning photographer, born July 16, 1959

Aviation 
 Mary Anita (née Snook) Southern, pioneer aviator, taught Amelia Earhart to fly.

Musicians 
 John Darnielle, musician from indie rock band The Mountain Goats; former Ames resident
 Envy Corps, indie rock band
 Leslie Hall, electronic rap musician/Gem Sweater collector, born in Ames in 1981
 Peter Schickele, musician, born in Ames in 1935
 Richie Hayward, drummer and founding member of the band Little Feat; former Ames resident and graduate of Ames High School

Journalists 
 Robert Bartley, editorial page editor of The Wall Street Journal and a Presidential Medal of Freedom recipient; raised in Ames and ISU graduate
 Wally Bruner, ABC News journalist and television host
 Michael Gartner, former president of NBC News; retired to own and publish the Ames Tribune

Politicians 
 Ruth Bascom, Mayor of Eugene, Oregon
 Edward Mezvinsky, former U.S. Congressman; father-in-law of Chelsea Clinton; raised in Ames
 Bee Nguyen, Georgia (U.S. state) state representative
 Bob Walkup, Mayor of Tucson, Arizona
 Lee Teng-hui, President of the Republic of China, ISU graduate
 Henry A. Wallace, 11th United States Secretary of Agriculture, 10th United States Secretary of Commerce, and 33rd Vice President of the United States, ISU graduate; lived in Ames from 1892 - 1896

Sports 
 Harrison Barnes, NBA player, 2015 NBA champion, 2016 U.S. Olympic gold medalist, Ames HS graduate
 Joe Burrow, NFL player, 2019 Heisman Trophy Award Winner, 2020 CFP National Championship Winner. Born in Ames, but grew up in The Plains, Ohio
 Juan Sebastián Botero, soccer player
 Doug McDermott, basketball player, Ames HS graduate
 Kip Corrington, NFL player
 Dick Gibbs, NBA player, Ames HS graduate
 Terry Hoage, NFL player
 Fred Hoiberg, retired NBA basketball player; raised in Ames, ISU graduate, former ISU basketball coach, former coach of the Chicago Bulls and current Nebraska men’s basketball coach.  
 Cael Sanderson, U.S. Olympic gold medalist; undefeated, four-time NCAA wrestling champion; former ISU wrestling coach and alumnus
 Herb Sies, pro football player and coach
 Billy Sunday, evangelist and Major League Baseball player; born in Ames in 1863
 Fred Tisue, Olympian water polo player

Scientists 
 George Washington Carver, inventor, Iowa State University alumnus and professor
 Laurel Blair Salton Clark, astronaut, died on STS-107
 Charles W. "Chuck" Durham, civil engineer, philanthropist, civic leader, former CEO and chairman Emeritus of HDR, Inc.; raised in Ames
 Lyle Goodhue, scientist, lived and studied here 1925–1934
 Dan Shechtman, awarded 2011 Nobel Prize in Chemistry for "the discovery of quasicrystals"; Professor of Materials Science at Iowa State University (2004–present) and Associate at the Department of Energy's Ames Laboratory
 George W. Snedecor, statistician, founder of first academic department of statistics in the United States at Iowa State University

Writers and poets 
 Ann Cotten, poet, born in Ames, grew up in Vienna
 Brian Evenson, author
 Jane Espenson, writer and producer for television, including Buffy the Vampire Slayer and Star Trek: The Next Generation, grew up in Ames
 Michelle Hoover, author, born in Ames
 Meg Johnson, poet and dancer
 Fern Kupfer, author
 Joseph Geha, author
 Ted Kooser, U.S. Poet Laureate; raised in Ames and ISU graduate
 John Madson, freelance naturalist of tallgrass prairie ecosystems
 Sara Paretsky, author of the V.I. Warshawski mysteries; born in Ames in 1947
 Jane Smiley, Pulitzer Prize-winning novelist; former instructor at ISU (1981–1996); used ISU as the basis for her novel Moo
 Neal Stephenson, author, grew up in Ames
 Hugh Young, coauthor of University Physics textbook
 Lincoln Peirce, cartoonist/writer of the Big Nate comics and books

Other 
 Neva Morris, at her death (2010) second-oldest person in the world and oldest American at the age of 114 years; lived in Ames her entire life
 Nate Staniforth, magician

Politics 
From 1979 through 2011, Ames was the location of the Ames Straw Poll, which was held every August prior to a presidential election year in which the Republican presidential nomination was undecided (meaning there was no Republican president running for re-election—as in 2011, 2007, 1999, 1995, 1987, and 1979). The poll would gauge support for the various Republican candidates amongst attendees of a fundraising dinner benefiting the Iowa Republican Party. The straw poll was frequently seen by national media and party insiders as a first test of organizational strength in Iowa. In 2015, the straw poll was to be moved to nearby Boone before the Iowa Republican Party eventually decided to cancel it altogether.

See also 

 Ames process
 North Grand Mall
 Reiman Gardens

References

External links 

Official Ames City Website
 Ames Campustown official site
The Main Street Cultural District

 
Cities in Iowa
Cities in Story County, Iowa
Populated places established in 1864
1864 establishments in Iowa